Nuctenea umbratica, the walnut orb-weaver spider, is a species of spider in the family Araneidae.

Name
The species name umbratica means "living in the shadows" in Latin.

Description

The walnut orb-weaver spider is very wide and flattened, with a leathery skin. Its color ranges from red brown and grey brown to black with a dark, yellowish to yellow-greenish leaf-like fleckled marking on its opisthosoma, where small dents are visible. These are the onsets of muscles that flatten the abdomen.

Female N. umbratica can reach up to 15 mm in size, the males grow only up to 8 mm.

The spider hides during the day outside of buildings in wall crevices, or under loose bark. They are very common in Central Europe; females occur all year long, while males appear mostly during summer. This spider has a flattened body, helping it to secrete itself in cracks and crevices. Walnut orb-weaving spiders are capable of concealing themselves in very confined spaces. This tends to act as a defensive advantage and increases the number of locations an orb-web can be effectively constructed. 

In the evening the spider constructs an orb-web that can be up to 70 cm in diameter. A signaling thread leads from the web to her hiding place. After dusk she sits in the web's center.

Distribution and subspecies
 Nuctenea umbratica (Clerck, 1757) – Europe to Azerbaijan
 Nuctenea umbratica nigricans (Franganillo, 1909) – Portugal
 Nuctenea umbratica obscura (Franganillo, 1909) – Portugal

References

 Levi, Herbert Walter: The orb-weaver genera Araniella und Nuctenea (Araneae: Araneidae). in: Bulletin of the Museum of Comparative Zoology, vol. 146, no. 6, Cambridge 1974. ISSN 0027-4100

External links

 Platnick, Norman I. (2008): The world spider catalog, version 9.0. American Museum of Natural History.

Araneidae
Spiders of Europe
Spiders of Asia
Fauna of Azerbaijan
Spiders described in 1757
Taxa named by Carl Alexander Clerck